The Se Sok O-Gye, or just O-Gye, is the moral code of the hwarang formulated by Buddhist monk Won Gwang consisting of five rules:

Loyalty to the country   (originally: Fealty to the king)
Respect and obey one's parents   (i.e. filial piety)
Show trust among friends   (i.e. candor and sincerity)
Never retreat in battle
Kill only with selective reasoning

''The code is still used by many Korean martial artists and can be found in gyms around the world.

References

Korean martial arts
Silla
Warrior code